The 1977 Football League Cup Final was played between Aston Villa and Everton and required three games to decide the winner, the only time this has happened in the League Cup. The first match took place at Wembley Stadium on 12 March and the game ended in a goalless draw. The replay on 16 March was only marginally better as the teams again played out a draw, this time at Hillsborough the home of Sheffield Wednesday. The game ended 1–1 with both goals scored by Everton players with Bob Latchford's last-minute equaliser nullifying Roger Kenyon's earlier own-goal.

The second replay took place at Old Trafford on 13 April. The game is probably best remembered for a 40-yard goal from Villa centre-half Chris Nicholl, and in a 2010 poll this was voted in the Top 25 of all-time League Cup moments. Brian Little scored his second of the match in dramatic fashion during the dying seconds of the game to give Villa a 3–2 victory. Mick Lyons and Bob Latchford scored for Everton.

Road to Wembley

Aston Villa
Villa defeated top-level teams Manchester City and Norwich City in their first two games, before a 4th round victory over Wrexham moved them into the last eight. Here they defeated second level Millwall 2–0. In the first leg of the semi-final they drew 0–0 at Queens Park Rangers, with the second leg also drawn (2–2), thus setting up a replay. Villa won this game 3–0 on 22 February (at Highbury) courtesy of a Brian Little hat-trick.

Everton
Conversely Everton's first two victories came against fourth level teams Cambridge United and Stockport County before a 3–0 fourth round victory over First Division Coventry City. In the quarter-finals they enjoyed a 3–0 win at Manchester United, resulting in a semi-final clash with second level Bolton Wanderers. After drawing the home leg, Everton won 1–0 at Burnden Park on 15 February to book their place at Wembley.

Final

Match details

Replay

Match details

For the first replay Villa replaced Cropley with Gordon Cowans, whilst Everton replaced Jones with Mike Bernard and Dobson with Roger Kenyon. Additionally Jim Pearson came on as a substitute for Hamilton.
|}

Second Replay

Match details

For the second replay the line-ups were as the original game except for Villa Ray Graydon and Gordon Cowans played instead of Gray and Carrodus, and Gordon Smith came on as a substitute for Gidman. Everton were as the original match except Neil Robinson replaced Jones and Jim Pearson replaced McKenzie, whilst Steve Seargeant came on as a sub for Pearson.

References

League Cup Final
EFL Cup Finals
League Cup Final 1977
League Cup Final 1977
Football League Cup Final
Football League Cup Final
Football League Cup Final
Sports competitions in Sheffield
1970s in Sheffield